Don Benito is a Spanish town and municipality in the province of Badajoz, Extremadura, near the left bank of the Guadiana river. According to the 2014 census, the municipality has a population of 37,011.

History
Don Benito dates from the 15th century, when it was founded by refugees from Don Llorente, who deserted their own town due to the danger of floods from the Guadiana.

On 28 March 1809, the 9 km separating Don Benito from Medellín was the site of a major French victory against Spanish troops during the Peninsular War.

By 2021, the municipal government of Don Benito worked alongside that of Villanueva de la Serena to fuse the two neighbouring municipalities into a single one, paving the way for a 2022 non-binding consultation. On 8 November 2021, the Council of Ministers sanctioned the celebration of the consultation, to be held on 20 February 2022. Both municipalities approved the merging, in the case of Don Benito by a whisker (a 66.2% of yes votes relative to the 66.0% threshold set in advance).

Geography
Don Benito has 37,048 inhabitants, and is part of an urban area with Villanueva de la Serena (26,071 inhabitants) 5 km away.

The municipality is composed by the town of Don Benito and seven villages:

Demographics

Transport
The town is served by a railway station on the Ciudad Real-Badajoz railway, part of an international line that links Madrid with Lisbon. It has been interested, along with the nearby Villanueva de la Serena, by a project of a tramway, not yet finalized. The town is also the southern terminus of the EXA2 motorway from Miajadas.

Famous residents
Florinda Chico (1926-2011), actress
Jesús Gil Manzano (b. 1984), referee
Juanma Gómez (b. 1981), footballer
Pedro Porro (b. 1999), footballer

Twin towns
 Fquih Ben Salah, Morocco

References

External links

 Don Benito official website 
 Roman Villa of La Majona in Don Benito

Municipalities in the Province of Badajoz